Sylvester Graham (July 5, 1794 – September 11, 1851) was an American Presbyterian minister and dietary reformer known for his emphasis on vegetarianism, the temperance movement, and eating whole-grain bread. His preaching
inspired the graham flour, graham bread, and graham cracker products. Graham is often referred to as the "Father of Vegetarianism" in the United States of America.

Early life

Graham was born in 1794 in Suffield, Connecticut, to a family with 17 children; his father was 72 years old when Graham was born and his mother was mentally ill. His father died when Graham was two, and he spent his childhood moving from one relative's home to another. One of his relatives ran a tavern where Graham was put to work; his experience with drunkenness there led him to hate alcohol his whole life and forswear drinking, which made him an exception among his peers at the time.  He was often sick, and missed a great deal of schooling.   He worked as a farmhand, cleaner, and teacher before deciding on the ministry as an antidote for his poor health. He entered Amherst Academy in his late 20s to become a minister, as his father and grandfather had been. He withdrew from school a year later though because his histrionic manner was scorned by his fellow students.

The expulsion caused Graham a nervous breakdown. To recover, he moved to Little Compton, Rhode Island. There, he met and married Sara Earl, who had nursed him back to health.  He studied theology privately, and in 1828 began working as an itinerant preacher at the Bound Brook Presbyterian Church in Bound Brook, New Jersey.

Career

In 1830, Graham accepted a position at the Philadelphia Temperance Society.  He left six months later to focus on preaching health.

Graham's appointment and conversion to vegetarianism came as the 1829–51 cholera pandemic was breaking in Europe, and Americans were terrified that it would reach the United States.  Accepted medical opinion was that the best way to prevent contracting cholera was to eat plenty of meat, drink port wine, and avoid vegetables.  People also believed that cholera was a plague, a punishment from God.

The Philadelphia Temperance Society was led not by ministers, as most other temperance societies were, but by doctors who were primarily concerned with the health effects of consuming alcohol.  Moving in that company, Graham may have met two of the other fathers of American vegetarianism: William Metcalfe, an English minister who established a vegetarian church in Philadelphia, and William A. Alcott, a Philadelphia doctor who wrote extensively about vegetarianism and wrote the first American vegetarian cookbook.  Graham taught himself about physiology and apparently arrived at his own conclusion that meat was just as much an expression of and spur to gluttony as alcohol was, that they corrupted both the body and soul of individuals and harmed families and society.  His belief was influenced by the book Treatise on Physiology by François-Joseph-Victor Broussais, published in Philadelphia in 1826, that claimed what people ate had enormous influence on their health. Graham's interest was also captured by the books written by the German chemist, Friedrich Accum, called Treatise on Adulteration of Foods, and Culinary Poisons, in which he denounced the use of chemical additives in food and especially in bread, and Treatise on the Art of Making Good and Wholesome Bread. Wheat flour at that time was often doctored to hide odors from spoilage, to extend it, and to whiten it, and bread was made from very finely ground flour (which Graham viewed as "tortured") and brewers yeast (used to make beer).

Like other members of the temperance movement, Graham viewed physical pleasure and especially sexual stimulation with suspicion, as things that excited lust leading to behavior that harmed individuals, families, and societies.  Graham was strongly influenced by the Bible and Christian theology in his own idiosyncratic way. He believed that people should eat only plants, like Adam and Eve in the Garden of Eden, and believed that plague and illness were caused by living in ways that ignored natural law. He urged people to remain calm, and not allow worry or lust to shake them from living rightly – perhaps one of the first people to claim that stress causes disease.

From these views, Graham created a theology and diet aimed at keeping individuals, families, and society pure and healthy – drinking pure water and eating a vegetarian diet anchored by bread made at home from flour coarsely ground at home so that it remained wholesome and natural, containing no added spices or other "stimulants" and a rigorous lifestyle that included sleeping on hard beds and avoiding warm baths.  The regimen has been described as an early example of preventive medicine. The emphasis on milling and baking at home was part of his vision of America in which women remained at home and nursed their families into health and maintained them there, as his wife had done for him.  Graham believed that adhering to such diet would prevent people from having impure thoughts and in turn would stop masturbation (thought by Graham to be a catalyst for blindness and early death).  His piece On Self-Pollution, published in 1834, contributed to the masturbation scare in antebellum America.  He believed youthful masturbation was dangerous to children's health because of the immaturity of their reproductive organs.

As a skilled and fiery preacher, his peculiar message, combining patriotism, theology, diet, lifestyle, and messages already prevalent from the temperance movement, captured the attention of the frightened public and outraged bakers and butchers, as well as the medical establishment.  When the cholera epidemic reached New York in 1832, people who had followed his advice appeared to thrive, and his fame exploded.   He published his first book in 1837, Treatise on Bread and Bread-Making, which included a history of bread and described how to make Graham bread. It was reprinted in 2012 by Andrews McMeel Publishing, as a selection of its American Antiquarian Cookbook Collection. His lectures in New York and Boston that year were thronged; the Boston lecture was disrupted by a threat of riots by butchers and commercial bakers.

Grahamism

As his fame spread, "Grahamism" became a movement, and people inspired by his preaching began to develop and market Graham flour, Graham bread, and graham crackers. He neither invented nor endorsed any specific product, nor did he receive any money from their sale. Graham influenced other Americans including Horace Greeley and John Harvey Kellogg, founder of the Battle Creek Sanitarium.

Grahamite boarding-houses were established in the 1830s. The Grahamites applied dietetic and hygienic principles to everyday life including cold baths, hard mattresses, open windows, a vegetarian diet with Graham bread and drinking cold water. Animal flesh was banned from Grahamite homes but eggs were allowed to be eaten at breakfast and were an important component of Grahamite diets.

American Physiological Society

In 1837, Colonel John Benson, Graham and William Alcott founded the American Physiological Society (APS) in Boston to promote Grahamism. Alcott was first President of the Society. After a year, the Society was reported to have had 251 members, including 93 women. It lasted just three years.

Laura J. Miller commented that the Society was "the most visible association promoting natural foods principles until the American Vegetarian Society was founded in 1850". Many of the APS members suffered from chronic disease and became vegetarian. It has been described as "likely the first exclusively vegetarian organization in the United States". It was also the first American natural hygiene organization. A notable member of the APS was Mary Gove Nichols, who gave health lectures to women.

In 1837, Graham and David Cambell founded The Graham Journal of Health and Longevity. It was "designed to illustrate by facts, and sustain by reason and principles the science of human life as taught by Sylvester Graham". It was edited by Campbell, Secretary of the APR (1837–1839) and five volumes were published. In 1840, the journal merged with the Library of Health, edited by Alcott.

American Vegetarian Society

In 1850, Alcott, William Metcalfe, Russell Trall, and Graham founded the American Vegetarian Society in New York City, modeled on a similar organization established in Great Britain in 1847.

Death
Graham died of complications after receiving opium enemas, as directed by his doctor, at the age of 57 at home in Northampton, Massachusetts. His early death was the source of criticism and speculation. Historian Stephen Nissenbaum has written that Graham died "after violating his own strictures by taking liquor and meat in a last desperate attempt to recover his health".

Russell Trall, who had visited Graham, noted that he had strayed from a strict vegetarian diet and was prescribed meat by his doctor to increase his blood circulation. Trall wrote that before his death Graham regretted this decision and "fully and verily believed in the theory of vegetable diet as explained in his works".

After his death, vegetarians distanced themselves from Grahamism. However, his vegetarian message was disseminated far into the 20th century.

Food historians cite Graham as one of the earliest food faddists in America.

Selected works

Of his numerous publications, the best known are:

 Treatise on Bread and Bread-Making (1837, and reissued in 2012 by Andrews McMeel Publishing)
 Lectures on the Science of Human Life (Boston, 1839), of which several editions of the two-volume work were printed in the United States and sales in England were widespread
 Lectures to Young Men on Chastity.
 A lecture on epidemic diseases generally: and particularly the spasmodic cholera (1833)
 A lecture to young men on chastity: intended also for the serious consideration of parents and guardians (1837)

See also
 Graham bread
 Graham cracker
 Graham flour
 James Caleb Jackson, the farmer, journalist, abolitionist, and doctor who invented the first manufactured breakfast cereal
 Isaac Jennings, physician who pioneered orthopathy
 Maximilian Bircher-Benner, the Swiss doctor who developed muesli
 Popular Health Movement
 Roman Meal, the later whole grain American bread company

References

Further reading

 Smith, Andrew F. Ed. The Oxford Encyclopedia of Food and drink in America. New York and Oxford: Oxford University Press, (2004).
 
 Burrows, Edwin G. and Mike Wallace, Gotham: A History of New York City to 1898. New York and Oxford: Oxford University Press, (1999).
 "Recent Deaths"; New York Daily Times; September 18, 1851; page 2. (Accessed from The New York Times (1851–2003), ProQuest Historical Newspapers, September 19, 2006)
 Nissenbaum, Stephen, Sex, Diet, and Debility in Jacksonian America: Sylvester Graham and Health Reform. Praeger, (1980).
 Sokolow, Jayme A. Eros and Modernization: Sylvester Graham, Health Reform, and the Origins of Victorian Sexuality in America. Fairleigh Dickinson University Press, (1983).

External links
 
 

1794 births
1851 deaths
19th-century American clergy
American health and wellness writers
American Presbyterian ministers
American nutritionists
American temperance activists
American vegetarianism activists
Native American people
Orthopaths
Opposition to masturbation
People from Suffield, Connecticut
Presbyterian Church in the United States of America ministers
Pseudoscientific diet advocates
Writers from Connecticut